John Edward "Parson" Massey (April 2, 1819 – April 24, 1901) served as the 15th Lieutenant Governor of Virginia from January 1, 1886, until January 1, 1890.  He was from Albemarle County, Virginia and a member of the Democratic Party.

A Baptist preacher, Massey considered himself the founder of the short-lived Readjusters.  However, when the "Big Four" revolted to buck Confederate-general-turned-Republican-boss William Mahone, Massey supposedly supported the revolt.  The "Big Four" were Andrew M. Lybrook of Patrick County, Peyton G. Hale of Grayson County, Samuel H. Newberry of Bland County, and B.F. Williams of Nottoway County.

Upon Massey's death, he was buried in Charlottesville's Oakhill cemetery. His autobiography appeared posthumously in 1909, edited by Elizabeth H. Hancock.

References

People from Albemarle County, Virginia
1819 births
1901 deaths
Lieutenant Governors of Virginia
Virginia Democrats
19th-century American politicians
People from Spotsylvania County, Virginia
Baptist ministers from the United States
Baptists from Virginia
19th-century American clergy